St. John's Lutheran Church is a historic church at Market and N. 7th Streets in Zanesville, Ohio.

It was built in 1926 and added to the National Register in 1982.

The church is a place of worship for practicers of Lutheranism

References

Lutheran churches in Ohio
Churches on the National Register of Historic Places in Ohio
Gothic Revival church buildings in Ohio
Residential buildings completed in 1926
National Register of Historic Places in Muskingum County, Ohio
Churches in Zanesville, Ohio